Diyaminauclea is a monotypic genus of flowering plants in the family Rubiaceae. The genus contains only one species, viz. Diyaminauclea zeylanica, which is endemic to Sri Lanka.

References

External links 
 Diyaminauclea in the World Checklist of Rubiaceae

Monotypic Rubiaceae genera